Francisco Pizaro de Orellana (1630–1683) was a Roman Catholic prelate who served as Bishop of Nueva Segovia (1680–1683).

Biography
Francisco Pizaro de Orellana was born in Manila, Philippines in 1630 and served as Archdeacon of Manila and commissary of the Holy Crusade. 
On 22 February 1680, he was selected by the King of Spain as Bishop of Nueva Segovia and confirmed by Pope Innocent XI on 27 May 1680 in Vigan.
In 1681, he was consecrated bishop. 
He served as Bishop of Nueva Segovia until his death on 2 September 1683. His death caused a long vacancy of the bishopric in the diocese with his successor not appointed until 1699 and not arriving until 1704.

References 

17th-century Roman Catholic bishops in the Philippines
Bishops appointed by Pope Innocent XI
1630 births
1683 deaths
People from Vigan
Roman Catholic bishops of Nueva Segovia